Edyta Czerwonka (born July 23, 1985) is a Polish female professional basketball player.

External links
Profile at fibaeurope.com
Profile at eurobasket.com

1985 births
Living people
Sportspeople from Częstochowa
Polish women's basketball players
Shooting guards